Rudolf Křesťan (born 14 March 1943 in Prague) is a Czech writer, editor and feuilletonist. He is the author of 16 books printed in more than 250,000 copies.

Career 
Křesťan spent his childhood in Stará Role near Karlovy Vary. From 1960 to 1966 he studied at the Institut osvěty a novinářství (Faculty of Journalism) of the Charles University in Prague. From 1964 to 1993 he worked as an editor in the Mladý svět magazine. After that, he was engaged in the Týdeník Televize. From 2003, he works as a freelance writer. During his career, he collaborated both with the Czech Television and the Czech Radio.

Bibliography 
Křesťan is known mainly as a feuilletonist. During his career, he wrote more than 1,000 feuilletons. He selected 33 of his best feuilletons for an audiobook published in 2009.

 Kos a kosínus (1969) – in collaboration with Vladimír Renčín
 Budeš v novinách (1976) – in collaboration with František Gel
 Myš v 11. patře (1980)
 Slepičí krok (1986)
 Kočky v patách (1990)
 Co láká poškoláka (1991) – illustrated by Vladimír Renčín
 Jak se do lesa volá (1992) – illustrated by Vladimír Renčín
 Jak jsem si užil (1995)
 Pozor, hodný pes! (1997)
 Nebuď labuť! (1999)
 Výlov mého rybníka (2000)
 Podkovaná blecha (2002)
 Kachna v bazénu (2004)
 Tandem aneb po dvou ve dvou (2006)
 Jsem z toho jelen (2008)
 Co jsem si nadrobil aneb Sypání ptáčkům (2010)

References 

Living people
Czech male writers
1943 births
Writers from Karlovy Vary
Charles University alumni
20th-century Czech writers
20th-century male writers
21st-century Czech writers
21st-century male writers